Leanne Kelly Champ (born 10 August 1983) is an English football player and coach, who last played for North Jersey Valkyries of the North American W-League. A tough-tackling full back who can also play in midfield, Champ previously played for FA WSL club Chelsea Ladies, Arsenal and Pali Blues as well as spending three spells with Millwall Lionesses. She has also represented England at youth and senior level. She is now the Pro Team Second Assistant Coach and Breakers College Academy Coach for the Boston Breakers in the NWSL.

Club career
Champ began her career with nine years at Millwall Lionesses, moving to Arsenal in 2001. She spent six years with Arsenal, working in the club laundry when not playing, before returning to Millwall during 2007–08. Champ had sat out Arsenal's quadruple-winning 2006–07 season with an anterior cruciate ligament injury. In the 2008–09 season, she helped Millwall to the FA Women's Premier League Southern Division title, and with it a return to the FA Women's Premier League National Division. Early in the 2009–10 campaign Champ switched to Chelsea and scored against former club Arsenal in a 3–2 home League defeat in November 2009.

She played for North American W-League club Pali Blues in summer 2010. She returned to Chelsea for the inaugural 2011 FA WSL and played in 13 of the club's 14 league matches. In 2012 Champ played for Philadelphia Fever in America's Women's Premier Soccer League Elite (WPSL Elite). She agreed a brief return to Millwall in January 2013, before heading off again to America in April 2013, with North Jersey Valkyries.

In 2014 Champ was employed as a soccer coach by the Boston Breakers. She coached the National Women's Soccer League club's academy teams and intended to play for the reserve team as player-coach.

International career
Champ played for England in the 2002 FIFA U-19 Women's World Championship and reached the quarter-final. She had previously won seven caps at U-16 level, and by 2001–02 was an established member of the senior squad.

In February 2003 Champ made her Senior debut in a 1–0 friendly defeat in Italy.

Coaching career
Leanne is a new member of the 2017 Boston Breakers coaching staff, serving as both the Pro Team Second Assistant Coach and the Breakers College Academy Coach as "part of the player identification and scouting network for both Boston Breakers senior teams, and Academy teams."

Personal life
Champ worked as a postwoman in her native Kent.

References

External links
Leanne Champ at Chelsea Ladies FA WSL website

1983 births
Living people
English women's footballers
Millwall Lionesses L.F.C. players
Expatriate women's soccer players in the United States
Arsenal W.F.C. players
Chelsea F.C. Women players
England women's international footballers
FA Women's National League players
Pali Blues players
Women's Super League players
USL W-League (1995–2015) players
Footballers from Portsmouth
Women's association football defenders
Women's association football midfielders
English expatriate sportspeople in the United States
English expatriate women's footballers